The 1989–90 FIBA Korać Cup was the 19th edition of FIBA's Korać Cup basketball competition. The Spanish Ram Joventut defeated the Italian Scavolini Pesaro in the final. This was Joventut's second time winning the title after a victory in 1981.

First round

|}

Round of 32

|}

Round of 16

Quarterfinals

|}

Semifinals

|}

Finals

|}

External links
 1989–90 FIBA Korać Cup @ linguasport.com
1989–90 FIBA Korać Cup

1989–90
1989–90 in European basketball